Hyperalgesia is the second full-length studio album by American alternative rock band Victorian Halls. The  album, that contains 11-tracks, was recorded in Gossip Studios, Chicago, produced by Sean Lenart, then mixed at legendary Sunset Sound Recorders in Hollywood, California, with help of renowned music producer and mixer Joe Chiccarelli, who has in the past produced dozens of albums for well-known acts and singers (such as Frank Zappa's Joe's Garage) and released in May 2015. The band produced the music video to the song Scarlets  from the album in June 2016 and then promoted the material from their new release on their “All My Friends Are Dead” US-wide Tour

Track listing

References

2015 albums
Victorian Halls albums
Victory Records albums